Kyler Gordon (born December 17, 1999) is an American football cornerback for the Chicago Bears of the National Football League (NFL). He played college football at Washington and was drafted by the Bears in the second round of the 2022 NFL Draft.

Early life
Gordon became a ballet dancer at a young age, and has used it to his advantage. Gordon's rare balance and jumping, as showcased at the NFL Combine, helped him become an early 2nd round draft pick many years later. Ballet is more of a hobby for him now as he moves to professional football, but he still credits ballet for a lot of his football success.

High school career
Gordon attended Archbishop Murphy High School in Everett, Washington. He played cornerback and wide receiver in high school. He committed to the University of Washington to play college football.

College career
Gordon played in four games his first year at Washington in 2018 and was redshirted. In 2019, he started four of 13 games, recording 32 tackles. In 2020, he started one of four games and had 18 tackles. Gordon became a full-time starter in 2021. On January 5, 2022, Gordon declared for the 2022 NFL Draft.

Professional career

Gordon was drafted by the Chicago Bears with the 39th overall pick in the second round of the 2022 NFL Draft. On October 24, in a Week 7 game against the New England Patriots, Gordon recorded his first career interception off of Patriots quarterback Bailey Zappe.

References

External links
 Chicago Bears bio
Washington Huskies bio

Living people
People from Mukilteo, Washington
Players of American football from Washington (state)
Sportspeople from the Seattle metropolitan area
American football cornerbacks
Washington Huskies football players
1999 births
Chicago Bears players